Days of Wrath (lit. "The Punisher") is a 2013 South Korean film about a man who, having been bullied as a teenager, seeks revenge against the former classmate who ruined his life.

Plot
Chang-sik bullied Joon-seok relentlessly during high school. And his girlfriend was raped by Chang-sik in front of him and committed suicide on the next day. Fifteen years later, the two encounter each other again. Chang-sik is working for a conglomerate, and preparing for his wedding. On the other hand, because of his traumatic experience, Joon-seok has a difficult time getting a decent job even though he graduated from a prestigious university; he works part-time as a valet park attendant and frequents a convenience store nearby. Unable to forget, Joon-seok prepares for revenge to make Chang-sik pay.

Cast
 Yang Dong-geun as Kang Chang-sik
 Joo Sang-wook as Joon-suk
 Lee Tae-im as Ji-hee
 Jang Tae-sung as Doo-joon
 Ban Min-jung as Mi-ok
 Na Hyun-joo as Hyun-joo
 Kim Kwon as Joon-suk (young)
 Kang Dae-hyun as Kang Chang-sik (young) 
 Seo Joon-yeol as Doo-joon (young)
 Kang Bok-eum as So-eun 
 Choi Hong-il as Uncle
 Han Chul-woo as Department head 
 Son Kang-gook - Home room teacher 
 Kim Ji-eun as Sun-mi  
 Jeon Gook-hwan as Chang-sik's father (cameo)
 Seo Dong-soo as History teacher (cameo)

Film Festival
In July 2014, the film was selected to be shown in the 2014 Fantasia International Film Festivalat Montreal, Canada.>

References

External links
  
 
 

2013 films
South Korean thriller films
South Korean films about revenge
Films about bullying
Films about school violence
Films directed by Shin Jai-ho
2010s South Korean films